The Colonel or the Colonels can refer to:

People
Colonel Sanders, the founder of Kentucky Fried Chicken (KFC)
Colonel Tom Parker, the manager for Elvis Presley
Jean-Charles Langlois, a 19th-century French soldier and painter

Arts
The Colonel (play), an 1881 play by F.C. Burnand
The Colonel (1917 film), a 1917 film directed by Michael Curtiz
The Colonel (1974 film), a 1974 film directed by Chatrichalerm Yukol
The Colonel (2006 film), a 2006 film directed by Laurent Herbiet
The Colonel (2016 film), a 2016 film directed by Tim Williams
The Colonel (Monty Python), a recurring character in Monty Python's Flying Circus, played by Graham Chapman
The Colonel (One Hundred and One Dalmatians), character in the story One Hundred and One Dalmatians
 "The Colonel" (The Americans), the thirteenth episode of the television series The Americans
The Colonel, a character in the Conker (series) video games
The Colonel, the alias used by Colin Moulding of the band XTC for the 1980 single release of Too Many Cooks in the Kitchen
The Colonel, the nickname of a character in the John Green novel, Looking for Alaska
The Colonel, a novel by Mahmoud Dowlatabadi
The Colonel, the short form of the title for Alanna Nash's book The Colonel: The Extraordinary Story of Colonel Tom Parker and Elvis Presley

Other
The Colonel, informal name for anyone with the military rank of colonel, whether actively serving or retired. See also Kentucky colonel
The Colonel (horse), a thoroughbred racehorse

The Colonels
The Colonels, a 1986 novel by W.E.B. Griffin
The Colonels, the regime of Polish colonels during the period 1926-1939
The Colonels, the Greek military junta of 1967–1974
The Colonels, rule by senior military officials, see military junta

See also
 Colonel (disambiguation)